Ajit Balakrishnan is an Indian entrepreneur, business executive and administrator. He is the founder, current Chairman and Chief Executive Officer of Rediff.com, an internet company based in Mumbai. He was Chairman of the Board of Governors of Indian Institute of Management Calcutta (IIM Calcutta) for two five-year terms ending in March 2017.

Education
Balakrishnan holds a Bachelor of Science from the University of Kerala and a Post Graduate Diploma in Management with Master in Business studies (MBA) from Indian Institute of Management Calcutta (1971).

Business
Balakrishnan's first business was Rediffusion, now known as Rediffusion DY&R (Dentsu Young & Rubicam), which he co-founded when he was 22.  In 1995, he founded Rediff.com, which became a highly successful internet site, and was listed on NASDAQ in 2001.

Writing
He writes a column in Business Standard and has written a book published by Macmillan Publishers called The Wave Rider. He has co-authored a research paper, Generic Framework for a Recommendation System using Collective Intelligence, with Alkesh Patel which was presented at the International Conference on Internet Technology and Secured Transactions, 2009.

Public service 
Balakrishnan served as the Chairman of the Board of Governors of IIM Calcutta for two five-year terms ending in March 2017. He presently serves on the Governing Council of Centre for Development of Advanced Computing (CDAC). He was named Chairman Emeritus of the Internet and Mobile Association of India (IAMAI). He has served as the Chairman of the Govt of India, Ministry of Information Technology Working Group on Internet Governance and Proliferation. He chaired a Committee appointed by India's Ministry of Human Resource Development on 'Research and Faculty Enhancement at the 7 IIMs'. He has served as a member of the Central Advisory Board of Education of the Government of India.

References

External links
The Wave Rider

Indian Institute of Management Calcutta alumni
Businesspeople from Mumbai
Indian chief executives
Indian mass media owners
University of Kerala alumni
Living people
Year of birth missing (living people)
Indian Internet celebrities
Indian advertising executives
Indian television executives